Nico Hillenbrand (born 25 May 1987) is a German footballer who plays for FC Astoria Walldorf as a defender.

Career
Hillenbrand was born in Heidelberg. He made his debut for the main Borussia Dortmund squad on 15 December 2007, when he came on as a substitute for Nelson Haedo Valdez in a game against VfL Wolfsburg. On 21 May 2009, he announced the return to his former club SV Sandhausen.

Honours
 DFB-Pokal finalist: 2007–08

References

1987 births
Living people
German footballers
Association football defenders
Borussia Dortmund players
Borussia Dortmund II players
SV Sandhausen players
FC Astoria Walldorf players
Bundesliga players
3. Liga players
Regionalliga players
Sportspeople from Heidelberg
Footballers from Baden-Württemberg